Joachim Böckerman (born 24 July 1997) is a Finnish football player.

Club career

He made his professional debut in the Veikkausliiga for HJK on 13 September 2015 in a game against FF Jaro.

References

External links
 
 

1997 births
Footballers from Espoo
Living people
Finnish footballers
Klubi 04 players
Veikkausliiga players
Helsingin Jalkapalloklubi players
Kyrkslätt Idrottsförening players
FC Honka players
FC Kiffen 08 players
Ekenäs IF players
Association football fullbacks